On Snow is a 2003 long poem by the German writer Durs Grünbein. It has the subtitle or Descartes in Germany (oder Descartes in Deutschland). It focuses on the life of the French philosopher René Descartes. Andreas Nentwich of Die Zeit described it as "a baroque picture arc of war, violence, vanity and a lot of snow".

See also
 2002 in poetry
 German literature

References

External links
 On Snow at the publisher's website

2003 books
2003 poems
German books
German poems
Cultural depictions of René Descartes